Sir Fenton Ramsahoye, QC, SC (20 May 1929 – 27 December 2018) was a Guyanese lawyer and politician who served for over twenty years in Antigua and Barbuda.

Biography 

Ramsahoye studied at London University where he was awarded B.A. in 1949 and LL.B., LLM  in  1953 and 1956. He was called to the bar at Lincoln's Inn on 10 February 1953 and was awarded Ph.D. in Comparative Land Law from London School of Economics and Political Science in 1959.

Ramsahoye was at the forefront of the independence movement. In 1961 he was elected a Member of Parliament of Guyana and remained in parliament until 1973. He was Attorney General of British Guiana from 1961 to 1964 and a member of Board of Governors of University of Guyana from 1962 to 1964. In 2006, he held the record for making the most appearances before the Judicial Committee of the Privy Council in the Caribbean. Ramsahoye was appointed Senior Counsel in Guyana in 1971. From 1972 to 1975 he was Deputy Director of Legal Education for the Council of Legal Education in the West Indies and head of Hugh Wooding Law School as a professor. 

Ramsahoye was a Queen's Counsel and a member of the bars of England and Wales, Guyana, Trinidad and Tobago, Barbados, Jamaica, the Territories of the Eastern Caribbean including Montserrat, and the British Virgin Islands. He was knighted in 2006 by Governor General Sir James Carlisle during a ceremony at Government House in Antigua. 

Ramsahoye married Phyllis Gwendolyn Lutz, the daughter of Richard Benjamin Lutz of South Australia. 

He died in Barbados on 27 December 2018 at the age of 89.

Publications
 
The Development of Land Law in British Guiana  Oceana Publications, New York, 1966 )(In

References

1929 births
2018 deaths
Lawyers awarded knighthoods
Alumni of the London School of Economics
Members of Lincoln's Inn
20th-century Guyanese lawyers
Guyanese Senior Counsel
Attorneys-General of British Guiana
Members of the National Assembly (Guyana)
Government ministers of Guyana
Guyanese expatriates in Antigua and Barbuda
20th-century King's Counsel
21st-century King's Counsel
21st-century Guyanese lawyers